Leucanopsis ephrem is a moth of the family Erebidae. It was described by William Schaus in 1905. It is found in Bolivia and Peru.

References

ephrem
Moths described in 1905